Haghartsin is a 13th-century monastery located near the town of Dilijan in the Tavush Province of Armenia.  It was built between the 10th and 13th centuries (in the 12th under Khachatur of Taron); much of it under the patronage of the Bagratuni Dynasty.

Etymology

Traditionally, an eagle was soaring over the dome of the main building at its dedication and thus it became commonly known as the monastery of the playing (or soaring) eagle ("Hagh" means a game while "Artsin", a form of "Artsiv", means eagle in Armenian).

St. Astvatsatsin Church 

St. Astvatsatsin Church in Haghartsin (1281) is the largest building and the dominant artistic feature. The sixteen-faced dome is decorated with arches, the bases of whose columns are connected by triangular ledges and spheres, with a band around the drum’s bottom. This adds to the optical height of the dome and creates the impression that its drum is weightless. The platband of the southern portal's architrave is framed with rows of trefoils.

The sculptural group of the church’s eastern facade differs in composition from the similar bas-reliefs of Sanahin, Haghpat, and Harich. It shows two men in monks’ attire who point with their hands at a church model and a picture of a dove with half-spread wings placed between them.  The umbrella roofing of the model’s dome shows the original look of the dome of Astvatsatsin church. The figures are shown wearing different dresses — the one standing right is dressed more richly than the one standing left.  The faces, with their long whiskers, luxuriant combed beards, and large almond-shaped eyes, are also executed in different manners.  These are probably the founders of the church, the Father Superior and his assistant.

Outside the south door is a khachkar carved by Poghos in the 13th century.

St. Astvatsatsin Church gavit 

The gavit of St. Astvatsatsin Church is severely damaged.  The ruins show clearly where it stood; however, the walls are almost completely destroyed.

St. Gregory Church 

The oldest large structure of the complex, probably dating from the 10th century, the Surp Grigor Church, is accessible through its gavit, which is wider than the church itself. The dome has an octagonal tambour. An important school of church music was set in this church.

St. Gregory Church gavit 

The 12th-century gavit abutting St. Grigor Church is the most common type of plan.  It is a square building, with roofing supported by four internal abutments, and with squat octahedral tents above the central sections, somewhat similar to the Armenian peasant home of the "glkhatun" type. The gavit has ornamented corner sections. Decorated with rosettes, these sections contain sculptures of human figures in monks' attires, carrying crosses, staffs, and birds. The framing of the central window of Haghardzin’s gavit is cross-shaped. Placed right above the portal of the main entrance, it emphasizes the central part of the facade.

One of the half-columns along the right-hand wall towards the back has come forward, showing that it is hollow.  According to legend, this was swung open and shut in the past and monastery riches were hidden inside at times of war and invasion.

St. Stepanos Church 

The small St. Stepanos Church dates back to 1244.

Bagratuni sepulchre 

The Bagratuni sepulchre is where some of the Bagratuni royalty are buried. It is located next to the gavit of St. Gregory Church.

Refectory 

Like the Haghpat's refectory, the refectory of Haghardzin, built by the architect Minas in 1248, is divided by pillars into two square-plan parts roofed with intersecting arches.

The walls are lined with stone benches, and at the western butt wall, next to the door, there is a broad archway for the numerous pilgrims to navigate. The decoration is concentrated only in the central sections of the roofing, near the main lighting apertures. The transition from the rectangle of their base to the octagon of the top is decorated with tre- and quatrefoils. The low abutments determine the size of the upstretched arches. The proportionally diminishing architectural shapes create the impression of airiness and space.

This space has large wooden log tables and chairs, where receptions occur after marriages or baptisms at the monastery.

World Heritage listing 

The monastery of Haghartsin, together with that of Goshavank, may become part of a natural site based on the state-protected area of Dilijan National Park, an important forest in north-eastern Armenia.

Current state 
In 2011, Haghartsin Monastery underwent a major renovation by Armenia Fund with a donation from HH Dr. Sheikh Sultan bin Muhammad Al-Qasimi, Ruler of Sharjah. Today the complex is reachable by a paved road with a large parking area, a gift shop, a bakery, and other facilities on site. In 2017 the monastery was incorporated into the Transcaucasian Trail long-distance hiking route.

Gallery

Sources 

 "Architectural Ensembles of Armenia", by O. Khalpakhchian, published in Moscow by Iskusstvo Publishers in 1980.
 "Rediscovering Armenia Guidebook", by Brady Kiesling and Raffi Kojian, published online and printed in 2005.

External links 

 Armeniapedia.org: Haghartsin Monastery
 Armenica.org: Haghartzin Monastery
 About Haghartsin Church

Religious buildings and structures completed in 1244
Religious buildings and structures completed in 1248
Religious buildings and structures completed in 1281
Christian monasteries in Armenia
Tourist attractions in Tavush Province
Christian monasteries established in the 13th century
Oriental Orthodox congregations established in the 13th century
Buildings and structures in Tavush Province